Periș is a commune in the far northwestern corner of Ilfov County, Muntenia, Romania. The commune is composed of three villages: Bălteni, Buriaș and Periș. It used to include Brătulești and Cocioc villages, until these were absorbed by other villages in the commune. In Romanian, its name means "a place where pear trees grow".

Geography
It lies on the right bank of the river Ialomița and on both sides of the river Vlăsia. 

History
It was the site of the Battle of Periș, on August 24, 1546, where Mircea the Shepherd, Voivode of Wallachia, launched a surprise attack on the boyars opposing his rule and greatly decimated them.

Natives
 Grigore Băjenaru (1907–1986), writer
 Dinu Cocea (1929–2013), actor, film director, and screenwriter
 George Dumitrescu (1901–1972), poet

References

Communes in Ilfov County
Localities in Muntenia